Corazzo is an Italian surname. Notable people with the surname include:

 Juan Carlos Corazzo (1907–1986), Uruguayan football player and manager

See also
Corazzini

Italian-language surnames